"Right Where I Need to Be" is a song written by Casey Beathard and Kendell Marvel and recorded by American country music artist Gary Allan. It was released in September 2000 as the third and last single from Allan's 1999 album Smoke Rings in the Dark.  The song reached number 5 on the U.S. Billboard Hot Country Tracks and Singles chart in June 2001, thus becoming his first Top 5 hit and his third Top 10.

Content
In this song, the narrator is a promotion-bound executive who is climbing the corporate ladder at the expense of his private life. His boss says he will get a promotion if he flies to New Orleans on business. The executive decides to leave his first-class seat empty in favor of staying with his significant other. He states that being with his lover is "right where [he] need[s] to be."

Music video
The music video was directed by Chris Rogers. The video was shot on a deserted runway at Nashville International Airport in 98 degree heat. It shows Allan and a full band performing the song on a mobile stage on the airport tarmac, while several women slowly show up behind a chain-link fence watching the performance and singing along. When the second chorus hits, the women (and some men as well) break down the fence and start running towards the stage, and disappear as they approach. It ends with a shot of a plane taking off.

Chart performance
Before it was released as a single, it charted from unsolicited airplay while "Lovin' You Against My Will" was still climbing the charts. According to Joel Whitburn's Hot Country Songs 1944–2008, this song spent 48 weeks on the country charts, giving it the longest chart run of the 2000s decade. Billboard credits the song with fewer weeks on the charts because of a rule change enacted starting with the chart dated January 13, 2001. Starting that week, Hot Country Singles shrank from 75 to 60 positions, so each song on the chart that week had its total number of weeks spent on the chart re-calculated to count only weeks spent at No. 60 or higher. As a result, Billboard reduced the total number of weeks that "Right Where I Need to Be" had spent on the charts from 23 to 16.

Before its release, "Right Where I Need to Be" was the b-side to the album's title track.

Year-end charts

Certifications

Notes

References

2000 singles
1999 songs
Gary Allan songs
Songs written by Casey Beathard
Songs written by Kendell Marvel
Song recordings produced by Tony Brown (record producer)
Song recordings produced by Byron Hill
Song recordings produced by Mark Wright (record producer)
MCA Nashville Records singles
MCA Records singles